United Left–The Greens: Plural Left or just Plural Left was an electoral alliance organized to contest the 2011 Spanish general election. It was led by United Left, with Cayo Lara as its leading candidate.

Composition

Electoral performance

Cortes Generales

References

United Left (Spain)
Defunct political party alliances in Spain
Socialist parties in Spain